GooglyMinotaur was an instant messaging bot on the AOL Instant Messenger network. Developed by ActiveBuddy under contract by Capitol Records, GooglyMinotaur provided Radiohead-related information, and was released simultaneously with the band's fifth studio album, Amnesiac in June 2001. GooglyMinotaur was named for the character that appears on the Amnesiac album cover.

ActiveBuddy's first offering, GooglyMinotaur was by November 2001 on 387,000 buddy lists and had received more than 36 million messages. It provided tour information, band facts, MP3 downloads, and assorted exclusive content provided by the studio, Capitol Records, in addition to the idle conversation that typified the chatterbots of that period.

In March 2002, GooglyMinotaur was switched off, and responded with the message "Since his catapult into buddy-hood, GooglyMinotaur has sent about 60 million IM messages to nearly 1 million different people. Always dependable and infinitely wise, Googly seemed fitter and happier up until his very last days. At this time, reports state the cause of death is undetermined."

References

Chatbots
Radiohead